Anna Croci (born 23 June 1972) is an Italian ice dancer. She competed in the ice dance event at the 1992 Winter Olympics.

References

External links
 

1972 births
Living people
Italian female ice dancers
Olympic figure skaters of Italy
Figure skaters at the 1992 Winter Olympics
Figure skaters from Milan